Before the start of the 1908 Tour de France, 162 cyclists had subscribed for the race, and received starting numbers. 48 cyclists did not start, so the first stage started with 114 cyclists.

Because the cyclists were not allowed to change bicycles, the separation in two different classes in the years before had disappeared, and all cyclists started in the same category. The favourite for the victory was Lucien Mazan "Petit-Breton", the winner of the previous edition. He was supported by his Peugeot-team, which included the best cyclists; in the five previous editions of the Tour de France, they had won 20 stages. In addition, Petit-Breton was a skilled bicycle mechanic, which was important because the rules said that cyclists had to repair their bicycle without help. The strongest opposition was expected from the Alcyon team, led by Georges Passerieu and Gustave Garrigou.

French athlete Marie Marvingt had tried to participate in the 1908 Tour de France, but was refused permission because the race was only open to men. She rode the route after the race, and managed to finish it.

By starting number

By nationality

References

1908 Tour de France
1908